Avraham Shochat (born 14 June 1936) is an Israeli former politician who twice served as Minister of Finance. He served as mayor of Arad for 20 years.

Biography
Avraham ("Beiga") Shochat was born in Tel Aviv during the Mandate era. After serving in the Israel Defense Forces as a corporal in the Nahal paratroopers, he attended the Technion, where he gained a BSc in Civil engineering, also being elected chairman of the university's Student Union during his studies.

Shochat is married to Tama, daughter of Israeli prime minister Levi Eshkol and they have three children.

Shochat was one of the founders of the modern city of Arad in 1962. As a civil engineer, he helped to plan Arad’s first permanent housing development. He worked as branch director of Solel Boneh in Arad and the Dead Sea area, and was a member of the Board of Directors of Israel Aircraft Industries and Negev Phosphates.

Political career
In 1967 Shochat became head of the Arad local council. He served as mayor of Arad for twenty years. In addition to his mayoral duties he was deputy chairman of the Union of Local Authorities, chairman of the Development Towns Committee of the Union of Local Authorities.

In the 1984 Knesset elections he was on the Alignment's Knesset list, but failed to win a seat. However, when Aharon Harel resigned from the Knesset in May 1988, Shochat replaced him. He retained his seat in elections in November that year, and became chairman of the Finance Committee and the Economic Affairs Committee. After being re-elected in 1992 (by which time the Alignment had become the Labour Party), he was appointed Minister of Finance by Yitzhak Rabin. Although he was re-elected again in 1996, the opposition Likud won the election and Shochat lost his ministerial position.

Following victory for Ehud Barak and One Israel (an alliance of Labour, Meimad and Gesher) in 1999, Shochat was once again appointed Minister of Finance. In October 2000 he was also made Minister of National Infrastructure replacing Eliyahu Swisa after Shas left Barak's coalition. After Ariel Sharon won special elections for Prime Minister in 2001, Shochat left the cabinet. In the 2003 elections he also lost his Knesset seat.

After leaving the Knesset, Shochat was commissioned to produce a report on tuition fees for Israeli university students. His report, published in July 2007, recommended raising fees for Bachelor's degrees by 70% and increasing government funding for higher education by NIS 1.5 billion.

References

External links

Avraham Shochat Jewish Virtual Library

1936 births
Israeli engineers
Eshkol family
Mayors of places in Israel
Living people
People from Tel Aviv
Alignment (Israel) politicians
Israeli Labor Party politicians
One Israel politicians
Technion – Israel Institute of Technology alumni
Ministers of Finance of Israel
Members of the 11th Knesset (1984–1988)
Members of the 12th Knesset (1988–1992)
Members of the 13th Knesset (1992–1996)
Members of the 14th Knesset (1996–1999)
Members of the 15th Knesset (1999–2003)
Members of the 16th Knesset (2003–2006)
People from Arad, Israel